Holly Peers (born 30 July 1986) is an English glamour model, born in Salford. She began modelling in 2009 when she was discovered by Alison Webster, photographer for the Sun newspaper, after appearing in the local press for a charity march through Manchester City centre to raise money for SOS (support our soldiers) Holly soon started appearing in The Sun's Page 3 (where she is known as Hollie Peers). She continues to model for Page 3, and she also regularly appears in magazines such as Nuts and Loaded.

She was also on the front cover of the 2011 and 2012 Page 3 calendars and the 2012 Hot Shots Calendar.

Peers was the highest new entry in "Nuts 100 Sexiest Babes 2010" at No. 6.

References

1986 births
Glamour models
Living people
Page 3 girls
People from Salford